Anthony Nikille Richard Howell (born 27 May 1986) was best known as an English professional football player for Mansfield Town FC. His playing position is primarily as a central midfielder, although he can play as a striker or winger. Howell has acted as an emergency goalkeeper for Alfreton.

Career
After various spells at non-league clubs (including a short spell at Mansfield), Howell signed for Alfreton, where he spent two-and-a-half years, helping the team to promotion to the Conference Premier in 2011.

He rejected a new contract at Alfreton to sign for Mansfield in June 2011. Howell helped Mansfield to the 2012–13 Conference title, and thus promotion to the Football League. He was rewarded for this with a new contract.

Howell played a big part in the third round of the FA cup match against Liverpool F.C, at the One Call Stadium on Sunday 6 January 2013. Howell's big moments in the game were his well saved shot by Brad Jones and his crunching tackle on Liverpool's goal scorer Luis Suarez.

Howell re-signed for Alfreton Town on a one-year contract on 29 July 2014.

On 28 October 2014 in an FA Cup replay against Lincoln City, Howell played in goal. This was due to injuries and Alfreton being unable to register a player that was not registered for the original game. Alfreton lost the match 5–1.

References

External links
 

1986 births
Living people
Footballers from Nottingham
English footballers
Association football midfielders
Alfreton Town F.C. players
Eastwood Town F.C. players
Hucknall Town F.C. players
Ilkeston Town F.C. (1945) players
Mansfield Town F.C. players
English Football League players
National League (English football) players
Rugby Town F.C. players